Vitaly Mikhailovich Bujanovsky or Buyanovsky (27 August 1928, in Leningrad – 5 May 1993, in Saint Petersburg) was a Soviet Russian classical horn player, music teacher and composer. He was the principal horn player at the Leningrad Philharmonic Orchestra under Yevgeny Mravinsky and professor at the Leningrad Conservatory. In 1985 he was elected an IHS Honorary Member.

External links
 Vitaly Bujanovsky's IHS Biography

References
 

1928 births
1993 deaths
Russian classical horn players
Saint Petersburg Conservatory alumni
Academic staff of Saint Petersburg Conservatory
Russian music educators
Russian composers
Russian male composers
20th-century classical musicians
20th-century composers
20th-century Russian male musicians
Burials at Serafimovskoe Cemetery